Tracheloptychus is a small genus of lizards in the family Gerrhosauridae. The genus is endemic to Madagascar.

Species
There are two species which are recognized as being valid.
Tracheloptychus madagascariensis  – Malagasy keeled plated lizard, Madagascar girdled lizard  
Tracheloptychus petersi  – Peters' keeled plated lizard

Etymology
The specific name, petersi, is in honor of German herpetologist Wilhelm Peters, who is the author of this genus.

References

Further reading
Boulenger GA (1887). Catalogue of the Lizards in the British Museum (Natural History). Second Edition. Volume III. ... Gerrhosauridæ ... London: Trustees of the British Museum (Natural History). (Taylor and Francis, printers). xii + 575 pp. + Plates I-XL. (Genus Tracheloptychus, p. 129; species T. madagascariensis, p. 129; species "T. petersii [sic]", p. 130).
Grandidier A (1869). "Descriptions de quelques animaux nouveaux découverts, pendant l'année 1869, sur la côte ouest de Madagascar ". Revue et Magazine de Zoologie pure et appliquée (Paris), Series 2, 21: 337-342. (Tracheloptychus petersi, new species, pp. 339–340). (in French).
Peters [W] (1854). "Diagnosen neuer Batrachier, welche zusammen mit der früher (24. Juli und 17. August) gegebenen Übersicht der Schlangen und Eidechsen mitgetheilt werden ". Bericht über die zur Bekanntmachung geeigneten Verhandlungen der Königlich Preussischen Akademie der Wissenschaften zu Berlin 1854: 614-628. (Tracheloptychus, new genus, p. 617; T. madagascariensis, new species, pp. 617–618). (in German and Latin).

Tracheloptychus
Reptiles of Madagascar
Lizard genera
Taxa named by Wilhelm Peters